"" is the single by Zard, released on May 6, 1996. The single debuted at #1 rank first week. It charted for 15 weeks and sold over a 747,000 copies and became the ninth highest-selling single in her career.

Track list
All songs are written by Izumi Sakai.

composer: Tetsurō Oda/arrangement: Daisuke Ikeda
Change My Mind
composer: Seiichiro Kuribayashi/arrangement: Takeshi Hayama
 (original karaoke)
Change my mind (original karaoke)

References

1996 singles
Zard songs
Songs written by Izumi Sakai
Songs written by Tetsurō Oda
Oricon Weekly number-one singles
1996 songs